Grandes Éxitos is the first greatest hits compilation by Spanish recording artist Mónica Naranjo released on September 30, 2002 through Sony. The album includes most of her hits from her first studio albums Mónica Naranjo (1994) and Palabra de mujer (1997).

Track listing

References

Mónica Naranjo compilation albums
2002 compilation albums
Sony Music compilation albums